In mathematics, the spectral radius of a square matrix is the maximum of the absolute values of its eigenvalues. More generally, the spectral radius of a bounded linear operator is the supremum of the absolute values of the elements of its spectrum.

Definition

Matrices
Let  be the eigenvalues of a matrix .

The spectral radius can be thought of as an infimum of all norms of a matrix. Indeed, on the one hand,  for every natural matrix norm ; and on the other hand, Gelfand's formula states that . Both of these results are shown below.

However, the spectral radius does not necessarily satisfy  for arbitrary vectors . To see why, let  be arbitrary and consider the matrix
. 
However, . As a result,
 

This is because any Hermitian Matrix is diagonalizable by a unitary matrix, and unitary matrices preserve vector length. As a result,

Bounded linear operators
We denote the spectrum by
 
The spectral radius is then defined as the supremum of the magnitudes of the elements of the spectrum:

Gelfand's formula, also known as the spectral radius formula, also holds for bounded linear operators: letting  denote the operator norm, we have

A bounded operator (on a complex Hilbert space) is called a spectraloid operator if its spectral radius coincides with its numerical radius. An example of such an operator is a normal operator.

Graphs
The spectral radius of a finite graph is defined to be the spectral radius of its adjacency matrix.

This definition extends to the case of infinite graphs with bounded degrees of vertices (i.e. there exists some real number  such that the degree of every vertex of the graph is smaller than ). In this case, for the graph  define:

Let  be the adjacency operator of :

Upper bounds

Upper bounds on the spectral radius of a matrix

The following proposition gives simple yet useful upper bounds on the spectral radius of a matrix.

Proposition. Let  with spectral radius  and a consistent matrix norm . Then for each integer :

Proof

Let  be an eigenvector-eigenvalue pair for a matrix A. By the sub-multiplicativity of the matrix norm, we get:

Since , we have

and therefore

concluding the proof.

Upper bounds for spectral radius of a graph 
There are many upper bounds for the spectral radius of a graph in terms of its number n of vertices and its number m of edges. For instance, if

where  is an integer, then

Power sequence

The spectral radius is closely related to the behavior of the convergence of the power sequence of a matrix; namely as shown by the following theorem.

Theorem. Let  with spectral radius . Then  if and only if

On the other hand, if , .

Proof

Assume that  goes to zero as  goes to infinity. We will show that . Let  be an eigenvector-eigenvalue pair for A. Since , we have

Since  by hypothesis, we must have

which implies |λ| < 1. Since this must be true for any eigenvalue λ, we can conclude that .

From the Jordan normal form theorem, we know that for all , there exist  with  non-singular and  block diagonal such that:

with

where

It is easy to see that

and, since  is block-diagonal,

Now, a standard result on the -power of an  Jordan block states that, for :

Thus, if  then for all  . Hence for all  we have:

which implies

Therefore,

On the other side, if , there is at least one element in  that does not remain bounded as  increases, thereby proving the second part of the statement.

Gelfand's formula

Gelfand's formula, named after Israel Gelfand, gives the spectral radius as a limit of matrix norms.

Theorem 

For any matrix norm  we have
.

Moreover, in the case of a consistent matrix norm  approaches  from above (indeed, in that case  for all ).

Proof
For any , let us define the two following matrices:

Thus,

We start by applying the previous theorem on limits of power sequences to :

This shows the existence of  such that, for all ,

Therefore,

Similarly, the theorem on power sequences implies that  is not bounded and that there exists  such that,  for all k ≥ N−,

Therefore,

Let }. Then,

that is,

This concludes the proof.

Corollary
Gelfand's formula yields a bound on the spectral radius of a product of commuting matrices: if  are matrices that all commute, then

Numerical example
Consider the matrix

Notes and references

Bibliography

See also 

 Spectral gap
 The Joint spectral radius is a generalization of the spectral radius to sets of matrices.
 Spectrum of a matrix
 Spectral abscissa

Spectral theory
Articles containing proofs